This is a list of seasons completed by the Penn State Nittany Lions football team of the National Collegiate Athletic Association (NCAA) Division I Football Bowl Subdivision (FBS). Since the team's creation in 1887, the Nittany Lions have participated in 1,368 officially sanctioned games, including 52 bowl games. For most of its existence, Penn State competed as an independent. In 1993, Penn State joined the Big Ten Conference, where it has been a member ever since.

Seasons

Notes

References

Penn State

Penn State Nittany Lions football seasons